Biankouma is a town in western Ivory Coast. It is a sub-prefecture of and seat of Biankouma Department in Tonkpi Region, Montagnes District. Biankouma is also a commune.

The town is divided into old and new towns, the old town buildings being heavily ornamented. Biankouma is also known for its fetish houses and Goua dances. Mont Sângbé National Park lies near the town.

In 2021, the population of the sub-prefecture of Biankouma was 71,470.

Villages
The twenty seven villages of the sub-prefecture of Biankouma and their population in 2014 are:

Gallery

Notes

Sub-prefectures of Tonkpi
Communes of Tonkpi